The Georgia Lady Bulldogs basketball team represents the University of Georgia in basketball. The Lady Bulldogs are a member of the Southeastern Conference (SEC). The "Lady Dawgs," as they are sometimes called, play in Stegeman Coliseum in Athens, Georgia. They have historically been among collegiate Womens Basketball's best programs. Georgia has won seven Southeastern Conference regular-season championships, four conference tournament championships and appeared in the NCAA Division I women's basketball tournament 33 times, tied for 2nd among all schools.  The team is coached by Katie Abrahamson-Henderson. The Lady Bulldogs have also appeared in 5 Final Fours and 11 Elite Eights, but have never won a National Championship.

History

Coach Landers was hired as the team's first full-time coach in 1979. Since the initial NCAA Division I women's basketball tournament in 1982, the Lady Dogs have appeared every year until (and including) 2014 with the exception of 1992 and 1994.

Year by year results

Conference tournament winners noted with # Source

NCAA tournament results

Home venues
 Stegeman Coliseum

Player awards

National awards
USBWA National Freshman of the Year
Tasha Humphrey – 2005
Naismith College Player of the Year
Saudia Roundtree – 1996

SEC Awards
Player of the Year Award
Katrina McClain – 1987
Saudia Roundtree – 1996
Kelly Miller – 2000, 2001

School records
Source

Career leaders
Points Scored: Janet Harris (2641)
Rebounds: Janet Harris (1398)
Assists: Teresa Edwards (63)
Steals: Sherill Baker (426)
3-pointers: Cori Chambers (282)

Single-season leaders
Points Scored: Katrina McClain(796, 1987)
Rebounds: Janet Harris, (397, 1983)
Assists: Saudia Roundtree (226, 1995)
Steals:  Sherill Baker (149, 2006)
3-pointers: Cori Chambers (85, 2007)

Single-game leaders
Points Scored: Coco Miller (45, 6 Dec 1997)
Rebounds: Katrina McClain (24, 10 Feb 1986)
Assists: Lady Hardmon 14, (6 Jan 1992)
Steals: Ashley Houts (10, 29 Nov 2006)

Triple-Doubles
 Teresa Edwards 24 points, 10 rebs. & 10 assists. vs. Alabama 1 Mar 1986
 Tracy Henderson 14 points, 13 rebs. & 10 blocks vs. Louisville 19 Mar 1995

See also
Uga (mascot)

Notes

References

External links